My Name Is Tanino is a 2002 comedy film directed by Paolo Virzì.  The picaresque plot is about Tanino, an Italian liberal arts student who falls in love with a young American tourist he meets in Sicily and decides to track her down in the United States.

Plot
Gaetano Mendolìa, nicknamed Tanino, is a native of the fictional Castelluzzo del Golfo, a small seaside resort in the province of Trapani, Sicily. He studies cinematography in Rome and dreams of becoming a movie director.

He meets Sally, an American girl vacationing in Italy, with whom he has a brief romance. At the end of her vacation, Sally returns to the fictional Seaport, Rhode Island but forgets her camera in Italy. Tanino decides to travel to the US with the pretext of returning Sally's camera to her but also to avoid Italian military service. He leaves at night without telling anyone.

After arriving in America, Tanino has a series of adventures with the somewhat shady Li Causi family, Italian-Americans living in the US. Eventually he leaves them and finally meets up with Sally and her "perfect" White Anglo-Saxon Protestant family, confounding them with his antics.

Later, Tanino escapes the clutches of the FBI by riding on the roof of a train and arrives in New York City where he meets his idol, director Seymour Chinawsky. However Chinawsky is reduced to poverty and dies soon after promising to make a film with Tanino.

Despite Tanino's many misadventures, he always comes out on top because of his ingenuity.

Cast 

Corrado Fortuna: Tanino Mendolia
Rachel McAdams: Sally Garfield
Frank Crudele: Angelo Maria Li Causi
Licinia Lentini: Marinella, mother of Tanino
Mary Long: Santa Li Causi
Beau Starr: Omobono
Jessica De Marco: Angelina
Lori Hallier: Leslie Garfield
Barry Flatman: Mr. Garfield
Don Francks: Chinawsky

See also  
 List of Italian films of 2002

References

External links
 
 

2002 films
Italian comedy films
Canadian comedy films
2002 comedy films
2000s English-language films
English-language Italian films
2000s Italian-language films
Films directed by Paolo Virzì
Films set in the United States
Films set in Sicily
2002 multilingual films
Canadian multilingual films
Italian multilingual films
Italian-language Canadian films
2000s Canadian films